Immanuel Church (Knesiyat Immanu'el;) is a Protestant church in the American–German Colony neighbourhood of Tel Aviv in Israel.

The church was built in 1904 for the benefit of the German Evangelical community, which it served until its dissolution at the onset of World War II in 1940. Today the church is used by a variety of Protestant denominations, including the Messianic movement.

Historical background
 George Adams and Abraham McKenzie, colonists from Maine arrived in Jaffa on 22 September 1866. They founded the American Colony in Jaffa, now part of Tel Aviv-Yafo municipality. They erected their wooden houses from prefabricated segments they had brought with them. Many settlers contracted cholera, and about a third of them died. Most returned to America. In 1869, newly arriving settlers from the Kingdom of Württemberg led by Georg David Hardegg (1812–1879) and Christoph Hoffmann (1815-1885), members of the Temple Society, replaced them.

However, in June 1874 the Temple denomination underwent a schism. Temple leader Hardegg and about a third of the Templers seceded from the Temple Society, after personal and substantial quarrels with Christoph Hoffmann. In 1878 Hardegg and most of the schismatics founded the Temple Association (Tempelverein), but after Hardegg's death in the following year the cohesion of its adherents faded.

First congregation (1899-1948)

History

Establishment
In 1885 Pastor Carl Schlicht of the  started to proselytise among the schismatics and succeeded in forming Evangelical congregations. In 1889 former Templers, Protestant German and Swiss expatriates, and domestic and foreign proselytes established the Evangelical congregation of Jaffa. Johann Georg Kappus sen. (1826–1905) became the first chairman of the congregation, seconded and later followed by his son Johann Georg Kappus jun. (1855–1928).

Sponsorship and pastors until 1914
Among the parishioners were wealthy members such as Plato von Ustinov and Wilhelm Friedrich Faber (1863–1923), president of the Deutsche Palästina-Bank, who moved to Jaffa in 1899 when the bank opened its branch there. Ustinov offered the new congregation the hall of his Hôtel du Parc in Jaffa for services.

Starting in 1890  granted Jaffa's Evangelical congregation financial subsidies. The pupils of apostate families had been excluded from the Templer school since 1874. The German government generally co-financed the schools of German language in the Holy Land with about a quarter of their annual budgets since 1880.

The Jerusalem's Association and the Lutheran Evangelical State Church in Württemberg agreed to pay the salary of a professional pastor for the Jaffa congregation. They hired Albert Eugen Schlaich from Korntal, a theologian and educator. He arrived on 10 March 1897 and stayed at Ustinov's hotel until he and his wife found suitable accommodations. The congregation rented the local chapel of the London Society for Promoting Christianity Amongst the Jews for an annual payment of 100 francs of the Latin Monetary Union for its services. Schlaich introduced some Lutheran traditions from Württemberg's state church. In 1900 ca. 30–40 congregants attended services on Sundays in the chapel of the London Jews Missionary Society.

In 1905 Schlaich accused the German Vice Consul Dr. Eugen Büge (1859–1936) in Jaffa to be breaking consular secrets in return for gifts. So Büge was transferred for disciplinary reasons to Aleppo, however, the German Foreign Office urged also Schlaich's transfer, since it considered Schlaich and not Büge to have damaged its reputation abroad. The , the executive board of the Prussian state church, pressurised Jerusalem's Association to release Schlaich from his office in Jaffa, thus he was appointed for another pastorate in Germany. The Jaffa congregation gave Schlaich a farewell on 25 December 1905, and Georg Johannes Egger (1842) thanked Schlaich and his wife for 9 years of successful pastoral work.

Between 1906 and 1912 the Jerusalem's Association and Evangelical State Church of Württemberg financed Pastor Wilhelm Georg Albert Zeller. He considered the growing Jewish immigration a threat to the Gentile German colonists, reporting their fears, that they could be expelled in the end, and thus recommended their emigration to a German, less populated colony in Africa.

On 6 April 1910 Prince Eitel Friedrich of Prussia and his wife Sophie Charlotte of Oldenburg visited Jaffa and Immanuel Church, where they were received by Pastor Zeller.

World War I (1914-1917)
After the outbreak of World War I the Sublime Porte de facto abolished the personal exterritoriality and consular jurisdiction for foreigners according to Capitulations of the Ottoman Empire on 7 September 1914. Many young male parishioners left Jaffa to join the German Imperial Army. Rabenau accompanied them to serve as military chaplain. The Prussian Evangelical Supreme Ecclesiastical Council ordered his return in October. His wife and their two sons moved to Germany for the duration of the war.

The Ottoman authorities forced all enemy missionary institutions to close in October 1914 and many missionary pupils then joined the joint Evangelical-Templer school of Jaffa. Their premises were confiscated for military purposes. In November 1914 the Ottoman Sultan Mehmed V declared in his function as Caliph the Jihad, which aroused fear for anti-Christian atrocities among the parishioners.

The war years were characterised by an increasing inflation of the Ottoman banknotes, causing Jerusalem's Association severe transfer losses at remitting salaries to its collaborators in the Holy Land, since the association had to purchase – in return for marks – foreign exchange denominated in inflationary Ottoman banknotes, which had to be sold again in Jaffa for less inflated Ottoman hard coins at a rate far below par. The war-related scarcity of goods further caused a dearness of most products so Jerusalem's Association had to increase its transfers to the Holy Land.

British rule until 1931
On 17 November 1917 Britons captured Jaffa and most male parishioners of Austrian, German or Ottoman nationality from Jaffa and Sarona, including Rabenau, were interned in Wilhelma as enemy nationals . In 1918 the interned men were deported to a camp south of Gaza, while the parishioners remaining in Jaffa were subjected to strict police control. In August 1918 the internees were relocated to Sidi Bishr and Helwan near Alexandria in Egypt . Rabenau and the internees built up congregational life in their Egyptian exile, lasting three years. With the Treaty of Versailes becoming effective on 10 January 1920 the Egyptian camps were dissolved and Rabenau became the internees' coordinator of the closedown. Most internees returned to the Holy Land, except of those banned by a British black list, such as D. Dr. Friedrich Jeremias, Provost of Jerusalem. Rabenau went to Germany to reunite with his family, the Britons refused his return to Jaffa in July 1920. In April 1921 the Prussian Evangelical Supreme Ecclesiastical Council appointed Gustaf Dalman, formerly head of the German Protestant Institute of Archaeology in Jerusalem as Provost at the Evangelical Church of the Redeemer until Albrecht Alt arrived.
 
In April 1926 Jerusalem's Association appointed Ernst Paetzold as auxiliary pastor for Jaffa. In September 1928 he held a lecture at the annual conference of Levantine Protestant pastors titled "Our congregations in their position towards other groups of German culture". By 1930 the German Jews made up the biggest group of Germans in the Holy Land, however a minority among all Palestinians, the Templers amounted to 1,300, and the remaining 400 Germans were – except of few Catholics (mostly clergy) and few irreligionists – prevailingly Protestant, among them 160 parishioners (as of 1927) of the Jaffa congregation.

In April 1931 Paetzold returned to Germany, and the pastorate remained unstaffed due to financial constraints in the Great Depression.

Pre-WWII position vs. the Nazis
When the Nazi Party aimed at roughing up with the Protestant church bodies in Germany as of 1932, especially with the constitutional election of presbyters and synodals of the old-Prussian church in November 1932, this did not play a role in the Holy Land. However, the newly founded Nazi Faith Movement of German Christians gained an average of a third of the presbyters and synodals in Germany.

After Adolf Hitler imposed on all German church bodies an unconstitutional reelection of all presbyters and synodals on 23 July 1933, the massive voter participation of Protestant Nazis, who had not shown up for years in services, let alone church elections, caused an extraordinarily high turnout, which yielded the German Christians a share of 70–80% of the presbyters and synodals, with some exceptions. However, this did not automatically mean the total takeover of the German Christians in all Protestant organisations, since due to the decentral and grassroot organisation of many Protestant groups, the official church bodies had no direct control, this was especially true for missionary endowments such as Jerusalem's Association.

In Germany the Protestant opposition first formed among pastors with the Emergency Covenant of Pastors, founded to fight for pastors discriminated by the German Christians for their Jewish ancestry. This covenant helped to found the Protestant Confessing Churches, which paralleled in all destroyed Protestant church bodies the official German Christian-subjected church bodies, which the Confessing Church considered to be schismatic for their abandonment of the universal sacrament of baptism. Most pastors in the Holy Land sided with the Confessing Church as also did most members of the executive board of Jerusalem's Association, among them Rabenau, an opponent of Nazism since 1931. Jerusalem's Association appointed pastors, fired or furloughed by Nazi-submissive official church bodies, for congregations in the Holy Land.

On October 18–20, 1933 the German Protestant missionary endowments within Deutscher Evangelischer Missionsbund (DEMB) convened in Barmen and rejected the attempt to subject the missionary societies – in the course of the pervasive Gleichschaltung of all civic organisations – to the Nazi-submissive German Evangelical Church. Jerusalem's Association retained its legal independence, successfully rejected the application of the so-called Aryan paragraph for its own employees and the new appointment of its executive board with a majority of two thirds for German Christians.

However, the Nazi-submissive German Christians, holding crucial positions in the bureaucracy of the official Protestant church bodies, found other ways to pressurise the missionary societies. Foreign exchange assigned at non-market rates was exclusively to be disbursed for salaries of German nationals, thus salaries of Palestinian citizens (e.g. Arab Protestants) became very difficult to organise, Jerusalem's Association had to incur debts in Palestine pounds with Deutsche Palästina-Bank, which again had to be permitted by the Nazi government, which submitted any foreign indebtedness of German legal entities to its agreement as part of its austerity policy.

Since missions depended on transferring funds abroad the government rationing of foreign exchange became the means to blackmail their cooperation. Jerusalem's Association gained a certain support within the German Christian-streamlined old-Prussian Evangelical Supreme Ecclesiastical Council and the Confessing Church, which both collected and transferred funds for the efforts of Jerusalem's Association. Since February 1934 the new Ecclesiastical Foreign Department (Kirchliches Außenamt) under German Christian  (1894–1967) of the new Nazi-submissive German Evangelical Church claimed the supervision of German Protestant missions. Heckel also presided the board of trustees of the Evangelical Jerusalem Foundation since 1933. Heckel decided on behalf of the Ecclesiastical Foreign Department to also subsidise salaries of ecclesiastical employees in Jaffa and Haifa earlier paid by Jerusalem's Association alone.

Unlike other missions Jerusalem's Association had only tiny revenues in foreign exchange out of Nazi control, namely the rent from the former Armenian Orphanage in Bethlehem, rented out to the British mandatory government for its insane asylum. Thus the foreign efforts of Jerusalem's Association mostly depended on transfers from Germany, now under Nazi government financial control. To get a ration of foreign exchange Jerusalem's Association needed the consent of the Evangelical Supreme Ecclesiastical Council, to cause the government rationing office allotting foreign exchange.

The Levantine Protestant pastors decided on their annual conference at Easter 1934 (1 April), to keep their congregations out of the German Nazi struggle of the churches . The pastors of Jaffa and Haifa anyway reported, that their congregations felt more related to Jerusalem's Association than to the Evangelical Church of the old-Prussian Union and its Provostry of Jerusalem.

In October 1934 the DEMB convened again in Tübingen, declaring its partisanship with the Confessing Church and its Barmen declaration of May 1934, however, the actual policy depended – case to case – on the opinion of the respective responsible person. While in Germany ecclesiastical media were banned to report on the struggle of the churches, there was no censorship in British Palestine. So Provost Ernst Rhein, the responsible editor of the "Gemeindeblatt", let his then Vicar Georg Weiß (later deacon in Nuremberg) report on the German struggle of the churches, openly siding with the Confessing Church, in his article on the occasion of Harvest Festival. German Christian Heckel, head of the Ecclesiastical Foreign Department, heftily criticised Rhein and Weiß for that article.

In February 1935 Rabenau, meanwhile a leading representative of the Confessing Church and opponent of Nazism, resigned from doing the German public relations of Jerusalem's Association. After the Brethren Council of the old-Prussian Ecclesiastical Province of Pomerania, the Pomeranian Confessing Church executive, had agreed to release its Vicar Felix Moderow, he moved to Jaffa to serve there as auxiliary pastor from 1935 to 1937. Also Provost Rhein demanded an opponent pastor as his new vicar and chose another Pomeranian theologist, Fritz Maass (1910–2005), as his vicar in Jerusalem.

However, in the German diplomatic service the so-called Aryan paragraph caused the furlough of Jerusalem's German Consul-General Dr.  in summer 1935, since his Protestant wife Ilse (d. 1988), serving as presbyter of the Jerusalem Evangelical congregation, counted by the Nazi racist categories as partially Jewish. "Among the German inhabitants in the country, only the [Jews and the] Lutherans expressed sorrow at Wolff's dismissal and their Jerusalem newspaper [Gemeindeblatt] published a warm article in praise of his activities. Similar sentiments were expressed in the Hebrew newspaper , which lauded his consular activity and heralded his efforts not to hurt the feelings of those opposed to the Nazi regime."<ref>David Kroyanker, "Swastikas over Jerusalem", in: Ha-Aretz.com, 13 November 2008, </ref>

In 1937 Pastor Christian Berg succeeded the retired Detwig von Oertzen in Haifa. Berg had been furloughed by his employer, the German Christian-streamlined Evangelical Lutheran State Church of Mecklenburg, after the Nazi government sued him in a political trial in Schwerin in June 1934. For him Palestine became a safe exile from further Nazi stalking. After the Olympic close hunting season was over in Germany, the Nazi government increased again its persecution of opponents. The Gestapo arrested Rabenau and seven further leaders of the Confessing Church on 23 June 1937, when leaving Berlin's Friedrichswerder Church. After interrogations and some time in detention he was released again.

The "Neueste Nachrichten aus dem Morgenland", the journal of Jerusalem's Association, complained about Jewish immigration to Palestine (1937) and Arab Nationalism (1939), which it regarded as being due to the infiltration by European decomposing ideologies.

After Moderow's return to Germany in 1937 the retired Oertzen served again as pastor in Jaffa until 1939. Jerusalem's Association in Germany experienced a growing hostility by anti-Semites to its name, referring to Jerusalem, and its journal, referring to the Levant. Thus on 27 February 1938 Jerusalem's Association adopted the name affix Jerusalemsverein/Versorgung deutscher evangelischer Gemeinden und Arabermission in Palästina (Jerusalem's Association/Maintenance of German Protestant congregations and missioning of Arabs in Palestine).

In July 1939 Oertzen left Jaffa for a summer holiday in Germany, but also to look after his salary, which had been withheld on a German account, for – in preparation of the war – the rationing office blocked most transfers abroad since early 1939. Jerusalem's Association used Haavara Ltd. for its transfers to Palestine between 1937 and 1939.

World War II and after
With Germany (September 1) and the Soviet Union (September 17) invading Poland in 1939, the Second World War started, followed by the British internment of most male Jaffa parishioners of German or other enemy nationality as enemy aliens. In May 1940 all remaining enemy aliens of Jaffa, Bir Salem, Sarona and Tel Aviv, not yet interned, such as Gentile Germans, Hungarians, and Italians, were interned in Wilhelma, which was converted into an internment camp. The remainder was evacuated to Cyprus in April 1948.

Relation to the Templers
The relations of the early Protestants of Jaffa were without major tensions.  had sold other real estate and his hospital, which he had built up, to the Templers on 5 March 1869 under the proviso to further cooperate with Reformed (Calvinist) deaconesses from Riehen  and to provide charitable health care for all, who needed itEisler 1999, pp. 46 and לט. The physician was Dr. Gottlob Sandel, father of the engineer . When in March 1897 Pastor Schlaich had arrived in Jaffa, the Templers offered him their fellowship hall for his first accession preach to the Evangelical congregation, and Schlaich accepted However, in October the same year, travelling and fund-raising in Württemberg, Schlaich unveiled that his aim is proselytising among Muslims and Templers, who felt deeply insulted to be mentioned in the same breath with non-Christian Muslims. So the relations chilled down again.

In 1897 and 1898 Templers of Jaffa and Sarona intrigued with the Sublime Porte and the German Foreign Office against the plans to build a combined Evangelical school and community centre, financed by generous donations of Braun and others. So the laying of the cornerstone for the Evangelical community centre was delayed, for Templers argued the title to the construction site would be under dispute So William II and Auguste Victoria could not attend it.

 German Emperor William II, his wife Auguste Victoria, protectress of Jerusalem's Association, and their entourage stayed in Jaffa on 27 October 1898. Their travel agency Thomas Cook accommodated the imperial guests in Ustinov's "Hôtel du Parc", the only establishment in Jaffa regarded suited for them, while the further entourage stayed in Hotel Jerusalem (then Seestraße, today's Rechov Auerbach #6; רחוב אוארבך) of the Templer Ernst Hardegg.

 All German citizens hoped after the visit for an improvement of their treatment by the Ottoman authorities, but in vain, the tiny community of Germans in the Holy Land only played a marginal role in the German-Ottoman relationship, which was not to be obfuscated by quarrelling settlers in the Holy Land.

The hospital, founded by Metzler and run since 1869 by Templers and Protestant deaconesses, was financed by a health insurance, which provided for higher contributions by Protestants and lower ones for Templers, who considered themselves as the main providers of the hospital since its purchase in 1869. Generally the revenues of the health insurance also covered the cost caused by poor patients from the general Jaffa population, who were treated even though they could not pay for it. In 1901 the relations between Protestants and Templers had eased so far, that the Protestant contributions were lowered to 20 and 30 francs p.a., before both religious groups paid equal contributions as of 1906

Pastor Zeller, who officiated in Jaffa since 1906, took his efforts to reconcile both groups. After ten years of negotiating the unification of the Evangelical and the Templer school, long rejected by the Provost of Jerusalem and Jerusalem's Association, due to their prejudices against Templers as sectarians, an agreement was achieved. On 27 October 1913 the Evangelical and the Templer school merged into a common school in the new school building of the Templers, completed in October 1912, until its demolition located in today's Rechov Pines, opposite to #44 It remained an oecumenical school until its closure by the Britons in November 1917. Jerusalem's Association spent 10% of its budget for schools in the Holy Land.

With the philosophy of the Temple Society, to reconstruct the Holy Land in order to gather the people of God, fading in view of the resurrection of the Holy Land by Jewish settlement, the Templers' faith lost binding power for many of its members and especially many younger discovered Nazism as a non-denominational replacement of the vacuum. Thus most Nazis in the Holy Land were from Templer background. This led to a complete turnaround in the Evangelical-Templers' relationship, because before 1933 the Evangelical Protestants had strong mental and financial support by German Protestant church bodies, while Templers were somewhat orphaned. After 1933 Templers increasingly usurped positions with influential connections to Nazi party and Nazi government bodies in Germany, while the German Protestant church bodies as partners of the Evangelical congregations in the Holy Land lost government support by the struggle of the churches and by Hitler's and Alfred Rosenberg's general abandonment of Christianity, considered indissolubly Judaised with the Ten Commandments and the Old Testament. Cornelius Schwarz, a Templer from Jaffa, led the Palestinian faction (Landesgruppe) of the Nazi party, with him many young men gained influence over long established institutions as the Evangelical provostry and its congregations as well as the Temple Society itself. The German Foreign Office imposed on Gentile Germans of different denominational affiliations a stronger co-operation under influence of Palestinian Nazi officials of Temple background.

Status and number of parishioners, 1899–1940
 1889 – the Evangelical congregation emerged
 1890 – it opened its school, its first permanent institution
 1894 and after – the congregation comprised parishioners in Jaffa and Sarona (today's haQiriya).
 1906 – the congregation of Jaffa included besides Sarona also Isdud and Ramla, and became a fully fledged congregation within the Evangelical State Church of Prussia's older Provinces, established according to its standards with full rights and bodies such as an elected presbytery (literally: congregation council).
 1925 – in December 1925 the Evangelical congregations of Jaffa, as well as that of Beirut (est. 1856), Haifa, Jerusalem and Waldheim joined the new umbrella organisation of the German Federation of Protestant Churches (1922–1933), then led by President Hermann Kappler.
 1940 – with the internment of most of its parishioners in Wilhelma the congregation de facto ceased to exist in 1940.

The number of parishioners developed as follows: 
1869: 18 persons
1889: 50 persons
1898: 75 persons
1900: 93 persons
1901: 104 persons

In 1903 parishioners in Jaffa and Haifa amounted to 250 altogether.
1904: 130 persons
1913: 136 persons.
1920: Jaffa congregation had lost parishioners through emigration after 1918.
1927: 160 persons
1934: 80–90 persons

Congregational institutions
On 18 July 1898 Metzler, who then lived in Stuttgart, conveyed his last piece of real estate in Jaffa for the construction of an Evangelical church, community centre and pastor's apartment, to the congregation, while his friend and divorced son-in-law Ustinov rewarded Metzler with 10,000 francs two thirds of the site's estimated price In August 1898 Ernst August Voigt, architect of Haifa, handed in his plans for a combined church, community centre, school and pastor's apartment.

The belated firman, permitting the building, finally arrived on 27 October 1898, after attempts of Templers to baffle the planned constructions, however, too late for an imperial attendance in the laying of the cornerstone.Foerster 1991, p. 108.

After Emperor William II's inauguration of the then Evangelical Church of the Redeemer in Jerusalem on Reformation Day, 31 October 1898, the bulk of the accompanying entourage was determined to return to Jaffa, to get back to their ship. However, a train accident on the Jaffa–Jerusalem railway, opened in 1892, interrupted their journey, so that they only arrived in Jaffa on November 2.

Thus the Protestant dignitaries among them participated in the laying of the cornerstone for the Evangelical church and community centre in Jaffa, among them Dr.  (*1832–1901*), Prussian minister of education, cult, culture and medicine, the executive board of Jerusalem's Association, D.  (*1831–1903*), president of the Evangelical Supreme Ecclesiastical Council and General Superintendents of different ecclesiastical provinces within the Evangelical State Church of Prussia's older Provinces, representatives of other German and Swiss Protestant church bodies (Braun for Württemberg), of the Lutheran Church of Norway and Church of Sweden as well as of other Protestant churches in Hungary, Italy, the Netherlands, and the US, altogether 45 women and men of the imperial delegation. From the local notables Christoph Hoffmann II (jun.), president of the Temple Society, and representatives of the Evangelical congregations in Bethlehem in Judea, Bir Salem, Haifa, and Jerusalem participated in the ceremony. Braun, court preacher of King William II of Württemberg, held the speech at the ceremony and donated himself 10,000 marks The actual cornerstone included the deed of foundation and seeds of grain and vegetables, symbolising the fertility of the Sharon plain.

The projected overall 30,000 marks were much too little, so some months later Jerusalem's Association withdrew from co-financing the project, it regarded to be nonserious. In 1899 Voigt declared the site to be too small for a community centre and a church, as was planned The congregation then spent with Braun's consent his donation of 10,000 marks for Heilpern's house (today's Rechov Beer-Hofmann #9), to become the school and rectory, for the latter of which it also serves today's congregation. However, then the German vice-consulate, still resided in that house and Consul Edmund Schmidt asked to be allowed to further stay there until the new, still-existing vice-consulate in today's Rechov Eilath # 59 would be completed. So the school stayed ad interim with Ustinov's "Hôtel du Parc". Metzler's former site in then Wilhelmstraße (today's Rechov Beer-Hofmann #15) was thus reserved for a future solitary church building.

In November 1917 the school had been closed by the Britons. All the property of the congregation, Jerusalem's Association and of parishioners of German and other enemy nationality was taken into public custodianship. With the establishment of a regular British administration in 1918 Edward Keith-Roach became the Public Custodian of Enemy Property in Palestine, who rented out the property and collected the rents, until the property was finally returned to its actual proprietors in 1925.

On 14 April 1918 John Mott and J. H. Oldham, two oecumenists, founded the Emergency Committee of Cooperating Missions, Mott becoming the president and Oldham the secretary. Mott and Oldham succeeded to get Art. 438 into the Treaty of Versailles, so that the property of German missions would be excepted from being expropriated for German reparations for World War I. Jerusalem's Association and the Evangelical Jerusalem Foundation had meanwhile appointed the Swedish Lutheran Archbishop Nathan Söderblom their speaker at the Britons.

In May 1919 Jerusalem's Association informed the Reich's commissioner on Germans as enemy nationals abroad, that its loss of property in the Holy Land amounted to 891,785 marks at its pre-war rate (about £44,589.25 or $212,329.76). The Treaty of Versailles, signed on 28 June 1919, finally became effective on 10 January 1920 and thus legalised the existing British custodianship of the property of the congregation, the parishioners and Jerusalem's Association. The schools of Jerusalem's Association were reopened under British government management in 1920. In April 1920 the Allies convened at the Conference of San Remo and agreed on the British rule in Palestine, followed by the official establishment of the civil administration on 1 July 1920. From that date on Keith-Roach transferred the collected rents for property in custodianship to the actual proprietors. The League of Nations legitimised this by granting a mandate to Britain in 1922 and Turkey, the Ottoman successor, finally legalised the British Mandate by the Treaty of Lausanne, signed on 24 July 1923 and becoming effective on 5 August 1925.Foerster 1991, p. 150. Thus the public custodianship ended in the same year and the prior holders achieved the fully protected legal position as proprietors. Jerusalem's Association applied for registration as Palestinian legal entity, granted in 1928.

Jerusalem's Association resumed its own schools and its school in Jaffa, held in condominium with the Templers, however, Provost Rhein complained about the decline of pupils in the Evangelical schools, whose parents were German, Austrian or other German-speaking Jews, especially in the difficult years of 1931 and 1932.

Starting in 1933 the new German Nazi government tried to get the German schools in the Holy Land under its influence, using again the dependence of the school providers on transfers from Germany. Oertzen and Rhein fought the deconfessionalisation of the Evangelical schools. Provost Rhein succeeded to resist the merger of the remaining Evangelical schools with Templer schools until 1937, on which occasion they became paganised, teaching the pupils Nazi Weltanschauung. In order to regain influence on the curriculum, Rhein then tried to join the Palestinian section of the National Socialist Teachers League (NSLB), but Palestinian NSLB president Dr. Kurt Hegele refused Rhein's membership. So by 1938 all Gentile teachers of German nationality had joined the NSLB, except of Rhein and some further Evangelical missionary .

After the begin of the Second World War in September 1939 all property of the Jaffa congregation, of its parishioners of German or other enemy nationality and of Jerusalem's Association were submitted to the Custodian of Enemy Property, Keith-Roach again, and the schools were supervised by the Committee for Supervision of German Educational Institutions under the Anglican bishop of Jerusalem, George Francis Graham Brown. With the internment of all Jaffa parishioners of German or other enemy nationality in 1940 the premises and houses in Jaffa were confiscated by the Mandatory government. Later the Anglican Church's Ministry Among Jewish People used the Immanuel Church for its services until 1947. The State of Israel, with Jaffa belonging to its state territory, succeeded the mandatory government in this custodianship in May 1948, however, excluding the building of Immanuel Church proper, since the new state did not seize places of worship.

Church building
History
After in 1899 the first construction works of a combined Evangelical church, community centre and school ended, with the cornerstone having been laid in November 1898, Jerusalem's Association returned as partner and financier of the church and commissioned Paul Ferdinand Groth (1859–1955), architect of Jerusalem's Evangelical Church of the Redeemer and renovator of All Saints' Church, Wittenberg, by the end of 1901 to design plans for the future solitary Immanuel Church.

Stuttgart's Court Preacher Braun started a fund-raising campaign, also attended by Grand Duchess Vera Constantinovna of Russia, the niece and adoptee of the late Württembergian Queen Olga and King Charles I, to collect the needed funds, with Braun and his wife themselves donating 25,000 marks. In 1902 the Ottoman authorities recognised the construction site in then Wilhelmstraße (today's Rechov Beer-Hofmann #15) as religious property, including its liberation from property tax .

After Jerusalem's Association threatened to choose another architect, if Groth would not downsize his plans to a less costly project, Groth provided plans for a cheaper church at the begin of 1903. Jerusalem's Association then commissioned the architect and Templer Benjamin Sandel (1877–1941), then leading the constructions of the Hagia Maria Sion Abbey in Jerusalem and son of the late Theodor Sandel, as supervisor, and the Templer Johannes Wennagel (1846–1927) from Sarona as building contractor, starting excavation on 11 May 1903, however, constructions progressed only slowly because Groth was late with sending the detailed plans, only completely arriving in February 1904. Groth then waived any honorary.

Braun, the most prominent donor for the congregation and church, travelled on behalf of Jerusalem's Association from Stuttgart to Jaffa to attend the inauguration of Immanuel Church, scheduled for Pentecost 1904 (May 22). Unfortunately he contracted dysentery after his arrival and died hospitalised in Jerusalem on 31 May 1904. He was buried on the Anglo-Prussian simultaneous Anglican-Evangelical Cemetery on Mount Zion, close to Samuel Gobat's grave.

The inauguration of Immanuel Church was then delayed to Monday June 6, held as a sober ceremony and attended by Büge, participants from other Evangelical congregations, and Templers. A year later on June 6  celebrated a memorial service for Braun.

Description
The walls are built from two kinds of natural stone, a yellowish-grey type of sandstone quarried close to Jaffa and a limestone, the so-called Meliki, from the mountains at Bir Nabala. The roof is covered with tiles from Marseille.

The interior of the approximately oriented prayer hall is covered by cross vaults, on its northern side a pipe organ was installed on a loft.

The tower, housing a staircase, flanks the northern side aisle and the westernmost bay of the main nave.

Furnishings

The furnishings were mostly imported from Germany. King William II of Württemberg and Queen Charlotte donated the church clock. In his function as summus episcopus of the Evangelical State Church of Prussia's older Provinces King William II of Prussia (also German Emperor) and his wife Auguste Victoria donated the main bell with the inscription "Gestiftet von S.M. d.K.u.K. Wilhelm II u. I.M. d.K.u.K. Auguste Victoria 1904/Zweifle nicht! Ap. Gesch. 10.20".

The , with Auguste Victoria as its protectress, donated the small bells. She also donated the altar bible with her handwritten dedication: "Ja kommet her zu mir alle, die ihr mühselig und beladen seid; ich will Euch erquicken."

Miss Neef from Stuttgart financed the altar and the pulpit, while Ustinov granted the congregation a great crucifix from olive tree wood. The parishioners collected 4,050 francs for the pipe organ, produced by Walcker Orgelbau in Ludwigsburg. In 1906 a plaque commemorating Friedrich Braun was fixed on the walls of Immanuel Church.

In 1977 Immanuel Church underwent a renovation, replacing the old windows and the pipe organ. The Norwegian Victor Sparre created the new windows of stained glass.  (*1903–1991*) from Göttingen created the new pipe organ in 1977. The apse is decorated by an inscription of the Hebrew verse  from the Gospel of John the Evangelist:

"כי כה אהב אלהים את העולם עד כי נתן את בנו יחידו למען לא יאבד כל המאמין בו, אלא ינחל חיי עולם."

Second congregation (1955–present)
On 29 August 1951 the State of Israel and the Lutheran World Federation, which took care of the formerly German Protestant missionary property in Israel, found an agreement on compensation for the lost missionary property and the future use of the actual places of worship.

Today a number of congregations besides the Lutheran are using the church.

The present Lutheran congregation is composed of a wide range of believers in Jesus from many different denominations. Some are either permanent residents or citizens of Israel and others are temporary workers in the country. All come together to worship and to affirm their common life together in meals, prayer, bible study and simple fellowship, both in regular services and throughout the week.

Church access and worship times
The church is open to visitors through the week. People of all faiths, and none, are most welcome.

The regular worship times are 11 am each Saturday (Shabbat) held in Hebrew and English, and at 10 am each Sunday in English. The Sacrament of Holy Communion is celebrated at almost all services which also have a strong element of bible teaching. Services are relatively informal and worshippers meet afterwards to share their experiences and meet visitors.

Concerts
Immanuel Church is used frequently for concerts of music, generally (but not exclusively) from the classical genre. The organ of the church is regarded as one of the best in the country and plays a big part in concerts, as well as its key use in regular worship.

Missionaries and pastors (1858–present)
 
 1858–1870: Missionary  (*1824–1907*)
 1866–1886?: Pastor Johannes Gruhler (*1833–1905*), only partially accepted due to his Anglican Rite
 1870/1886–1897: vacant
 1885–1895: Pastor Carl Schlicht (*1855–1930*) in Jerusalem, per pro
 1897–1906: Pastor Albert Eugen Schlaich (*1870–1954*)
 1906–1912: Pastor Wilhelm Georg Albert Zeller (*1879–1929*)
 1912–1917: Pastor  (*1884–1959*)
 1917–1920 (in Egyptian exile): Pastor von Rabenau continued to serve the interned parishioners
 1917–1926 (for the parishioners remaining in Jaffa): vacant
 1917–1918: D. Dr. Friedrich Jeremias (*1868–1945*), Provost of Jerusalem, per pro
 1921: Prof. D. Dr. Gustaf Dalman, provost per pro
 1921–1926: Pastor Detwig von Oertzen (*1876–1950*) in Haifa, per pro
 1926–1931: Cand. Ernst Paetzold (*1899–1957*)
 1931–1935: vacant
 1931–1935: Ernst Rhein (*1885–1969*), Provost of Jerusalem, and Pastor von Oertzen (Haifa) per pro
 1935–1937: Vicar Felix Moderow (*?-?*)
 1937–1939: Pastor Detwig von Oertzen rtrd.
 1939–1940?: vacant
 1940?–1947: A minister of the Anglican Church's Ministry Among Jewish People served at Immanuel Church
 1947–1955: vacant
 ...
 2004–2009: Pastor Jan H. Mortensen
 2009–2016: Pastor Christian Rasmussen
 2016–2018: Rev. Bradley Long
 2022–present: Eyvind Volle 

Noteworthy parishioners
 1912–1917/1920: Eitel-Friedrich von Rabenau
 1892–1913?: Jona von Ustinov
 1878–1913: Plato von Ustinov

References
 , Die Siedlungen der württembergischen Templer in Palästina (1868–1918) (11973), [התיישבות הגרמנים בארץ ישראל בשלהי השלטון הטורקי: בעיותיה המדיניות, המקומיות והבינלאומיות, ירושלים :חמו"ל, תש"ל; German], Stuttgart: Kohlhammer, 32000, (Veröffentlichungen der Kommission für geschichtliche Landeskunde in Baden-Württemberg: Reihe B, Forschungen; vol. 77). , simultaneously: Jerusalem, Hebr. Univ., PhD (Diss.), 1970.
 Eisler, Ejal Jakob (איל יעקב איזלר), Der deutsche Beitrag zum Aufstieg Jaffas 1850–1914: Zur Geschichte Palästinas im 19. Jahrhundert, Wiesbaden: Harrassowitz, 1997, (Abhandlungen des Deutschen Palästina-Vereins; vol. 22) .
 Eisler, Ejal Jakob (איל יעקב איזלר), ""Kirchler" im Heiligen Land: Die evangelischen Gemeinden in den württembergischen Siedlungen Palästinas (1886–1914)", in: Dem Erlöser der Welt zur Ehre: Festschrift zum hundertjährigen Jubiläum der Einweihung der evangelischen Erlöserkirche in Jerusalem, Karl-Heinz Ronecker (ed.) on behalf of the 'Jerusalem-Stiftung' and 'Jerusalemsverein', Leipzig: Evangelische Verlags-Anstalt, 1998, pp. 81–100. .
 Eisler, Ejal Jakob (איל יעקב איזלר), Peter Martin Metzler (1824–1907): Ein christlicher Missionar im Heiligen Land [פטר מרטין מצלר (1907–1824): סיפורו של מיסיונר נוצרי בארץ-ישראל; German], Haifa: אוניברסיטת חיפה / המכון ע"ש גוטליב שומכר לחקר פעילות העולם הנוצרי בארץ-ישראל במאה ה-19, 1999, (פרסומי המכון ע"ש גוטליב שומכר לחקר פעילות העולם הנוצרי בארץ-ישראל במאה ה-19/Abhandlungen des Gottlieb-Schumacher-Instituts zur Erforschung des christlichen Beitrags zum Wiederaufbau Palästinas im 19. Jahrhundert; vol. 2), 
 Foerster, Frank, Mission im Heiligen Land: Der Jerusalems-Verein zu Berlin 1852–1945, Gütersloh: Gütersloher Verlags-Haus Mohn, 1991, (Missionswissenschaftliche Forschungen; [N.S.], 25), simultaneously: Marburg upon Lahn, Univ., Magisterarbeit, 1987/88 and Berlin, Evang. Kirche in Berlin-Brandenburg (Berlin West), Wiss. Hausarb. for the first theological examination, 1988/89, 
 Löffler, Roland, "Die Gemeinden des Jerusalemsvereins in Palästina im Kontext des kirchlichen und politischen Zeitgeschehens in der Mandatszeit", in: Seht, wir gehen hinauf nach Jerusalem! Festschrift zum 150jährigen Jubiläum von Talitha Kumi und des Jerusalemsvereins, Almut Nothnagle (ed.) on behalf of 'Jerusalemsverein' within Berliner Missionswerk, Leipzig: Evangelische Verlags-Anstalt, 2001, pp. 185–212. .
 Rhein, Christoph, "Als Kind der deutschen Propstes in Jerusalem 1930–1938", in: Dem Erlöser der Welt zur Ehre: Festschrift zum hundertjährigen Jubiläum der Einweihung der evangelischen Erlöserkirche in Jerusalem, Karl-Heinz Ronecker (ed.) on behalf of the 'Jerusalem-Stiftung' and 'Jerusalemsverein', Leipzig: Evangelische Verlags-Anstalt, 1998, pp. 222–228. .
Sinnū, ʿAbd-ar-Raʿūf (Abdel-Raouf Sinno, عبد الرؤوف سنّو), Deutsche Interessen in Syrien und Palästina, 1841 – 1898: Aktivitäten religiöser Institutionen, wirtschaftliche und politische Einflüsse'', Berlin: Baalbek, 1982, (Studien zum modernen islamischen Orient; vol. 3), simultaneously: Berlin, Freie Univ., Diss., 1982

Notes

External links
 
 Website 
 Website 

Tel Aviv Immanuel
Churches in Tel Aviv
Tel Aviv Immanuel
American diaspora in Israel
Arab Israeli culture in Tel Aviv
Austrian diaspora in Israel
European-Israeli culture in Tel Aviv
German diaspora in Israel
Lutheran churches in Israel
Messianic Judaism
Norwegian diaspora in Asia
Tel Aviv Immanuel
Swiss diaspora in Israel